The 2005–06 Football League Trophy, known as the LDV Vans Trophy for sponsorship reasons, was the 23rd season in the history of the competition. A straight knockout competition for English football clubs in the third and fourth tiers of the English football league system.

In all, 60 clubs entered the competition. It was split into two sections, Northern and Southern, with the winners of each section contesting the final at the Millennium Stadium, Cardiff. The competition began on 18 October 2005 and concluded on 2 April 2006.

The 2006 final was branded simply as the Football League Trophy after the new owners of LDV withdrew sponsorship of the competition in March 2006 due to the company entering administration, also meaning no prize money was awarded to the winners.

The winners were Swansea City, who defeated Carlisle United 2–1.

First round
The First Round ties took place on 18 and 19 October 2005. Four clubs received a bye into the Second Round. Bradford City and Port Vale in the Northern section, and Colchester United and Walsall in the Southern section.

Northern section

Southern section

Second round
The Second Round ties took place on 22 and 23 November 2005. The Woking vs. Cheltenham Town match was abandoned with the scores at 2–1 to Cheltenham due to heavy fog after 50 minutes. The game was eventually played on 28 November 2005, with Cheltenham triumphing 5–1 in extra time. The Halifax vs. Scunthorpe United game was additionally postponed until 13 December 2005 due to bad weather conditions.

Northern section

Southern section

Quarter finals
The Quarter final ties took place on 13 and 20 December 2005.

Northern section

Southern section

Semi finals
The Semi final ties took place on 24 January 2006.

Northern section

Southern section

Area Finals

Northern section

Southern Section

Final

References

External links
Official website

EFL Trophy
Trophy
Trophy
2005–06 domestic association football cups